Campsicnemus scambus is a species of fly in the family Dolichopodidae. It is distributed in Europe, except for the south.

References

External links
Images representing Campsicnemus at BOLD

Sympycninae
Insects described in 1823
Asilomorph flies of Europe
Taxa named by Carl Fredrik Fallén